is a fictional character from SNK's fighting game franchise The King of Fighters. She first appears as the sub-boss and playable character in The King of Fighters 2000; she enters as a normal participant in her other appearances. She is also present in a number of spin-off games in the franchise, most notably SNK Heroines: Tag Team Frenzy as well as Akihiko Ureshino's novelizations of the games and comic books from China.

However, during NESTS' destruction, Kula forms a bond with K' and his allies to the point of joining his team. In following titles she lives with K' under the care of the cyborg Maxima.

Kula was created to add more characters to the NESTS syndicate and to add more depth to the series' second story arc. Her physical appearance was carefully designed to appeal to female players. Yumi Kakazu has voiced Kula in all of her appearances, while Kat Cassteneda provides her English voice in the spin-off game KOF: Maximum Impact 2.

At first the character got a mixed reception as comparisons were made between her and earlier SNK fighters. Subsequently, journalists and video game reviewers have been largely positive about Kula liking her fighting style, mostly for her use of ice, as well as her contrast with K'. However, the character's attractiveness also earned a mixed reaction. Critics were divided over her beauty and her skimpy designs in SNK Heroines: Tag Team Frenzy.

Creation and design

SNK created Kula Diamond to bring more complexity to the NESTS' story arc in the series. Her character added another dimension to the villainous NESTS organization in the NESTS Chronicles. She was to add excitement to the story as an enemy and a foil of K'. Newly hired female staff designed her to depict a "14-year-old girl" with "appropriately girlish" gestures. The unnamed character designer was pleased with Kula's design saying: "Kula had an easy delivery. She didn't give me any pain." Despite being K''s foil, Kula's was designed to closely resemble her rival as both fighters wear similar leather outfits with contrasting colors. According to artist Hiroaki, Kula does not look like a 14 year old girl in the illustrations. Nevertheless, he claims he grew attached to drawing her alongside K'.

Yumi Kakazu has voiced Kula in all of her appearances. In KOF: Maximum Impact 2, Falcoon gave her a color palette that makes her look like fighter Ash Crimson as well as the robot Candy. Her alternative costume is that of a coquettish ice skater. Falcoon also once envisioned an adult version of Kula for the game Kimi wa Hero.

For The King of Fighters XIII, the staff decided to make Kula similar to her original incarnation in The King of Fighters 2000. The team had no problems in designing her gameplay and added taunts where the character becomes boring. Similar to K's moves, the developers wanted Kula's trademarks, most notably her ice moves, to be appealing to see. A move that exemplifies this was the "Crow Bites". Kula's "Diamond Breath" move was recommended for new players, while the "Reispin" was designed to make the gameplay more complex and challenging as Kula becomes stronger when executing it. Kula's strongest technique in the game involves the appearance of Foxy and Diana who attack the enemy alongside her. This technique went through numerous trials before it was added to the game.

When developing The King of Fighters XIV with the Unreal Engine, the original game had more realistic visuals but they clashed with character designs of Kula and Athena Asamiya. The designs looked like those in an anime series so the designers opted for the current look. A programmer with the alias of "Ando" designed the blades on Kula's boots during special attacks. Kula was the first character in KOF XIV to be given this type of design, requiring multiple attempts to work with her 3D character model. Ando further believed Kula could wield other type of weapons based on the variety used by the cast but in the end felt using blades could prove to be more challenging. An extra outfit for Kula was released for The King of Fighters XIV as downloadable content.

In SNK Heroines: Tag Team Frenzy, Kula appears wearing Ángel's skimpy clothing. Director Kaito Soranaka said during an interview that Kula was his favorite character in the game. Ogura said that having Kula wear Ángel's outfit brought up the fact that Kula hates Ángel, so the game's villain, Kukri, gave her that appearance to humiliate her.

Appearances
Kula Diamond is a teenage girl who was experimented on by NESTS in order to exterminate the cartel's traitor, K'. Despite the fact their subject was a mindless puppet with no sign of emotions, the NESTS cartel created an android called Candy Diamond to monitor Kula's behavior and to ensure that she would accomplish her missions. During KOF 2000, Kula can be fought as a mid-boss during her debut. Shortly afterwards, Kula destroys the main Zero Cannon from its titular creator who is betraying NESTS. Candy shields Kula's descent from space by sacrificing her body in the process, as it is badly burned by Earth's atmosphere. While recovering from the trauma of Candy's destruction, in the following game, The King of Fighters 2001, Kula enters into the fighting tournament with fellow NESTS' agents Foxy, K9999 and Ángel to capture K'. During the story, Kula and Foxy are betrayed by K9999 and Ángel. However, in K's Team ending among others, she is seen as being safe and forms a friendship with her original target and allies. In the story-less game, KOF 2002, Kula appears as member of a team with Ángel and K9999.

In KOF 2003, she appears in the ending of the K' Team where the group go to recruit her following an apparent threat. She participates in KOF XI and KOF XIII with K' and Maxima as her allies, having also joined forces with the Ikari Team. They are assigned to investigate a group known as "Those From the Past". In KOF XIV, she once again participates in the tournament following the Ikari's orders to investigate NESTS' agents. During these games, the K' Team becomes allied with the Ikari Team to help them on missions though they tend to avoid them. Prior to The King of Fighters XV, Kula and K' end up having a falling out each other because he and Maxima are too busy over capturing remaining NESTS’ remnants instead of taking vacation for a while with her, causing her to join a team consisting former NESTS Agents, Angel and a mysterious agent who is in fact K9999's current identity, Krohnen McDougall, unbeknownst to Kula.

Kula is also present in the spin-off games, Neowave which does not feature a story and KOF: Maximum Impact 2 where looks for a doctor to repair Maxima's cybernetic body. She also appears in The King of Fighters '98: Unlimited Match Online and The King of Fighters Online. She is also present KOF: Sky Stage, Neo Geo Heroes: Ultimate Shooting and SNK Heroines: Tag Team Frenzy. In SNK Heroines, the female fighters must fight their way home but are confronted by Kukri and defeat him before he can initiate his grand plan on the kidnapped female fighters. She also makes a cameo appearance alongside Maxima in the ending of K' from NeoGeo Battle Coliseum. She is playable in the mobile phone game Kimi wa Hero (as an adult) and Brave Frontier, while also making a cameo in the dating sim Days of Memories should the player interact with K'. She has since made guest appearances in more games, including the role-playing game Valkyrie Connect. She also appears as a downloadable character in Koei Tecmo's fighting game Dead or Alive 6. In her story chapter, NiCO pulls her into the Dead or Alive dimension while experimenting with subspace portals. Kula and NiCO briefly spar, and NiCO later thanks her for providing "interesting data" while swearing her to secrecy.

The printed adaptations of The King of Fighters retell Kula's role in the NESTS' story arc where she constantly clashes with K', having a more antagonistic characterization until the events of 2001 and 2002. She also appears in the CD dramas from KOF 2000, in which she attacks K' before the events of her the story. However, this ends when K' is knocked out by Maxima for fighting with his wounded arm and the fugitive escapes with the unconscious K' from Kula. A cyborg named Rugal Bernstein kidnaps Kula during the 2002 storyline to absorb her powers. Using this, Rugal manages to defeat the fighters Kyo Kusanagi and Iori Yagami, but in the end he is stopped by K' and Maxima who rescue their former enemy. In the comic of The King of Fighters XII, Kula engages the mysterious Magaki alongside K' and former NESTS' agent Nameless.

Reception
Kula's character has been mostly well received. Den of Geek listed her as the 35th best character of the franchise, citing her appealing upbeat characterization while liking the idea of her not only being a foil for K', but how she "simply centers him by being his loving opposite". In an article on the history of SNK, GameSpot described Kula as the yin to the yang due of K' to how different both characters are in terms of the elements they control while fighting. Falcoon noted the character had become popular with fans of the series as after a poll on his Twitter account asking what character he should draw. GameSpot, however, criticized Kula and Hinako as the least interesting additions to the cast of The King of Fighters 2000.

IGN found Kula to be one of the most appealing characters in The King of Fighters 2000 though the reviewer felt newcomer Lin might be superior. In another article, the same site liked the fact Kula was as a regular playable character unlike the original version, but felt she was still overshadowed by Lin. In a later review, IGN lamented the lack of Geese Howard but believed both Kula and K' could fill the gap. IGN felt Kula's inclusion in The King of Fighters 2002 alongside K', rather than other famous characters in the series, works with those that are included. Eurogamer and other publications enjoyed return of the originally "inexplicably" absent from The King of Fighters XII in following titles of "familiar faces" alongside Maxima and K'. 4thLetter enjoyed the contrast between K's characterization from that of his teammates, Maxima and Kula, noting that the team's ending from XIII had him enjoying his vacation by beating up unknown enemies. PlayStation Universe opined fans should look forward to Kula and K' in The King of Fighters XIV as their game styles would appeal to gamers. In a review for KOF: Maximum Impact 2, GameSpot felt Kula and Billy Kane were two of the best new characters. In a museum of videogames sponsored by the municipality of Rome, a special illustration lists Kula as the mascot of the new millennium era of Neo Geo.

GameZone enjoyed her fighting mechanics in The King of Fighters XI, comparing her style to "athletes participating in the acclaimed Olympic event" enjoying SNK's execution of the character despite the reviewer's dislike of the concept. 3DJuegos felt that Kula's moves in The King of Fighters XI were overpowered; she was far more balanced in XIV. Siliconera found her fighting style in SNK Heroines: Tag Team Frenzy to be ridiculous due to the use of "cups of what appears to be sorbet".

Other reviewers focused on the character's sex appeal. Cheat Code Central referred to Kula as one of the most sexually appealing female characters in gaming thanks to her design, abilities, and traits, comparing her looks to those of Hatsune Miku. Universo Nintendo also enjoyed the alternative outfits for Kula, especially her dancer costume. Shoryuken liked Kula's alternative outfits in SNK Heroines, noting how they give her distinct looks. However, the site noted the fact that Kula can wear skimpy dresses might divide players and make them uncomfortable due to her young age. Atomix was more critical of the release of SNK Heroines for having their female characters fight in skimpy dresses. A similar response was given when Kula appeared as a guest character in Dead or Alive 6 for her young age. Nevertheless, Destructoid found the character's moves appealing. The sexualization was once again pointed out in October 2020 through a commercial for the mobile phone game SNK Allstar where Terry Bogard harasses her alongside Mai Shiranui and Blue Mary.

References

Female characters in video games
Genetically engineered characters in video games
The King of Fighters characters
SNK protagonists
Video game characters introduced in 2000
Video game characters with ice or cold abilities
Woman soldier and warrior characters in video games